Extra Jabardasth is an Indian Telugu-language sketch comedy television show. It is an extended version of the comedy show Jabardasth. The show is hosted by Rashmi Gautam which broadcasts on the ETV. This show was first telecasted on 10 October 2014. It is one of the most popular Reality Shows on Telugu Television, but it is criticized for its obscene and problematic content.

It was initially judged by actor Nagendra Babu and actress Roja until Nagendra Babu left the show. Later it was judged by Roja and Mano with a few guest Judges occasionally. It is now judged by Kushboo Sundar and Krishna Bhagavaan.

Concept 

Teams

References

Indian comedy television series
2014 Indian television series debuts
2010s comedy television series
Telugu-language television shows
ETV Telugu original programming
Variety television series